Al-Bu Nasir is one of the Arab tribes in Iraq. It is a Sunni Arab shepherd (Arabic: الراعي) tribe comprising some 35,000 people who primarily inhabit the town of Tikrit and the surrounding area of northern central Iraq, as well as many other area in south and center of Iraq. The progenitor of the Al-Bu Nasir tribe was Ahmed ibn Hussein ibn Ibrahim ibn Mahmoud (ناصر بن حسين بن إبراهيم بن محمود), who was a descendant of Ibrahim ibn Musa al-Kazim.

Although not very numerous, the Al-Bu Nasir nonetheless obtained a reputation of being "a difficult lot of people, cunning and secretive, whose poverty drove most of them to pervert the Bedouins' legendary qualities of being warlike and fearless." Like many Iraqi tribes, it follows the Hanafi fiqh and it traced its origins to the Arabian Peninsula and maintained cordial ties with other related clans and tribes. Al-Bu Nasir migrated from the Arabian Peninsula to Iraq during the Ottoman era.

The tribe rose to prominence in the 1960s, when one of its members, Ahmed Hassan al-Bakr, seized power in Iraq. Bakr's successor, Saddam Hussein, was also a member of the Al-Bu Nasir and the tribe became a crucial element of his hold in power from 1979 to 2003. Saddam drew heavily on the tribe to fill the upper echelons of his government and in particular to manage his security apparatus, notably the Intelligence Service and the Special Republican Guard. Most of the key posts in the Iraqi government were held by members of the Beijat clan group and Majid extended family to which Saddam belonged; some elements of the regime's security apparatus, such as Saddam's bodyguards, were recruited exclusively from the al-Bu Nasir

 He recruited tens of thousands of supporters, whom he placed in command positions in the Iraqi Army, from a number of other tribes allied to the al-Bu Nasir. The resulting network of tribal alliances, centred on the al-Bu Nasir and bound to them by payment and patronage, provided the backbone of Saddam's regime.

The power of the al-Bu Nasir and their tribal allies reached its zenith in the 1990s, when Saddam's regime was under great strain from the effects of international sanctions. Tribal chiefs were given extensive patronage, money and weapons as well as membership of the national assembly as a means of binding them to the regime. The old Ba'ath Party structures were to some extent sidelined in favour of an explicitly tribal power structure centred on the al-Bu Nasir. However, the 2003 invasion of Iraq and the overthrow of Saddam Hussein greatly reduced the influence of the al-Bu Nasir in the new Iraq.

Notable members
Youssef Izz al-Din al-Nasiri, Minister of Education 1936-1937
Ahmed Matlab, Minister of Culture 1967
Ahmed Hassan al-Bakr, President of Iraq 1968-1979
 Saddam Hussein, President of Iraq 1979-2003
Fadel al-Barrak, chief of the Mukhabarat
 Adnan Khairallah ,  the Defence Minister of Iraq from 1979 to his death in 1989.
 Uday Hussein and Qusay Hussein, sons of Saddam Hussein
 Ali Hassan al-Majid, former Iraqi Defence Minister and cousin of Saddam Hussein
Ghanem Qaddouri al-Hamad, president of Tikrit University

References

Tribes of Arabia
Arab groups
Tribes of Iraq
Tribes of Syria
Husaynids